The 2010–11 season was the 87th season in the existence of AEK Athens F.C. and the 52nd consecutive season in the top flight of Greek football. They competed in the Super League, the Greek Cup and the UEFA Europa League. The season began on 19 August 2010 and finished on 25 May 2011.

Events

 17 May: Full-back Anestis Argyriou joins AEK Athens from Panthrakikos on a 4-year deal.
 17 May: Young centre-back Spiros Matentzidis joins AEK Athens from Panthrakikos on a 4-year deal.
 2 June: Striker Nikos Liberopoulos joins AEK Athens from Eintracht Frankfurt on a 1-year deal.
 7 June: AEK Athens agreed to compete in the 2010 Sydney Festival of Football against Blackburn Rovers, Rangers and hosts, Australia Sydney Football Club.
 11 June: International Service Oil will sponsor AEK Athens for three years.
 15 June: Goalkeeper Giannis Arabatzis signs new 3-year deal.
 26 June: Striker Éder joins AEK Athens from Flamengo on a 1-year loan deal.
 2 July: Experienced centre-back Dellas joins AEK Athens from Anorthosis on a 1-year deal.
 5 July: Midfielder Claudio Dadómo joins AEK Athens from Cerro on a 2-year deal.
 13 July: Tenacious midfielder Papa Bouba Diop joins AEK Athens from Portsmouth on a 3-year deal.
 14 July: Strong centre-back Giorgos Alexopoulos is released from AEK Athens.
 19 July: Midfielder Ilie Iordache is released from AEK Athens.
 4 August: Midfielder Seidu Yahaya is released from AEK Athens.
 13 August: Experienced centre-back Daniel Majstorović is released from AEK Athens to join Celtic.
 31 August: Midfielder Lefteris Intzoglou joins AEK Athens.
 31 August: Experienced midfielder Christos Patsatzoglou joins AEK Athens.
 31 August: Centre-back Cristian Nasuti joins AEK Athens on loan from River Plate on a 1-year deal.
 9 October: Manolo Jiménez agrees a 2-year deal with AEK Athens.
 25 November: Midfielder Nacho Scocco signs a new 3-year deal.
 3 January: Striker Michalis Pavlis is released from AEK Athens.
 21 January: Midfielder Míchel joins AEK Athens on loan from Birmingham City on a six-month deal.
 31 January: Forward Nabil Baha joins AEK Athens on a six-month deal.
 31 January: Centre-back David Mateos joins AEK Athens on loan from Real Madrid on a six-month deal.

Players

Squad information

NOTE: The players are the ones that have been announced by the AEK Athens' press release. No edits should be made unless a player arrival or exit is announced. Updated 30 June 2011, 23:59 UTC+3.

Transfers

In

Summer

Winter

Out

Summer

Notes

 a.  Genoa paid €200K to AEK for the player's expenses.

Winter

Loan in

Summer

Winter

Loan out

Summer

Winter

Renewals

Overall transfer activity

Expenditure
Summer:  €1,080,000

Winter:  €255,000

Total:  €1,335,000

Income
Summer:  €0

Winter:  €0

Total:  €0

Net Totals
Summer:  €1,080,000

Winter:  €255,000

Total:  €1,335,000

Club

Management

Kit

|

|

|

Other information

Pre-season and friendlies

Sydney Festival of Football

Matches

Super League Greece

Regular

League table

Results summary

Results by Matchday

Fixtures

Play-offs

Results by Matchday

Fixtures

Greek Cup

AEK entered the Greek Cup at the Round of 32.

Matches

Quarter-finals

Semi-finals

Final

UEFA Europa League

Play-off round

Group stage

Statistics

Squad statistics

! colspan="15" style="background:#FFDE00; text-align:center" | Goalkeepers
|-

! colspan="15" style="background:#FFDE00; color:black; text-align:center;"| Defenders
|-

! colspan="15" style="background:#FFDE00; color:black; text-align:center;"| Midfielders
|-

! colspan="15" style="background:#FFDE00; color:black; text-align:center;"| Forwards
|-

! colspan="15" style="background:#FFDE00; color:black; text-align:center;"| Left during Winter Transfer Window
|-

|-
|}

Disciplinary record

|-
! colspan="20" style="background:#FFDE00; text-align:center" | Goalkeepers

|-
! colspan="20" style="background:#FFDE00; color:black; text-align:center;"| Defenders

|-
! colspan="20" style="background:#FFDE00; color:black; text-align:center;"| Midfielders

|-
! colspan="20" style="background:#FFDE00; color:black; text-align:center;"| Forwards

|-
! colspan="20" style="background:#FFDE00; color:black; text-align:center;"| Left during Winter Transfer window

|-
|}

Starting 11

UEFA rankings
{|
|valign="top" width=33%|

UEFA team ranking

|valign="top" width=33%|

UEFA country ranking

References

External links
AEK Athens F.C. Official Website

2010-11
Greek football clubs 2010–11 season
AEK Athens